Campanula troegerae is a species of flowering plant in the bellflower family Campanulaceae. It is native to north-eastern Turkey. It can be found in the provinces of Artvin and Erzurum.

Distribution

Status
It is listed as critically endangered by the IUCN. Habitat destruction from agriculture poses a major threat to the species.

References

troegerae